Cynthia Hall may refer to:

 Cynthia B. Hall, a member of the New Mexico Public Regulation Commission
 Cynthia Holcomb Hall, a United States federal judge
 Cynthia Hall, March 1971 Playboy Playmate
 Cynthia Hall, wife of Tony Hall, Baron Hall of Birkenhead, and former headmistress of The School of St Helen and St Katharine, and of Wycombe Abbey
 Cynthia Hall, wife of Florida politician Charlie Hall